Mademoiselle is a 1966 French–British drama film  directed by Tony Richardson. The dark drama won a BAFTA award and nomination and was featured in the 2007 Brooklyn Academy of Music French film retrospective. Jeanne Moreau plays an undetected sociopath, arsonist and poisoner, a respected visiting schoolteacher and sécretaire at the Mairie in a small French village.

Synopsis
As the film begins, Mademoiselle is shown opening floodgates to inundate the village, so there's never a moment in the film that the audience believes she's a normal upstanding citizen, as the villagers do. But the film provides little insight into her motivation; she has no cause for revenge, and acquires no material gain or increased standing in the community from her furtive crimes. Later, she sets fire to houses and poisons the drinking troughs, causing the death of farm animals.

Out of pure prejudice, an Italian woodcutter (Manou, played in Italian by Ettore Manni) is the chief suspect. Sexual tension arises between Mademoiselle and Manou during a series of encounters in the forest. Finally, after a night of somewhat perverse intimacy in the fields, she falsely denounces him and the villagers hack him to death.

In the final scene, as Mademoiselle is leaving the village for ever, it is made obvious that the woodcutter's son (and Mademoiselle's former pupil) knows the secret.

Cast

Jeanne Moreau – Mademoiselle
Ettore Manni – Manou
Keith Skinner – Bruno
Umberto Orsini – Antonio
Georges Aubert – René
Jane Beretta – Annette (as Jane Berretta)
Paul Barge – Young Policeman
Pierre Collet – Marcel
Gérard Darrieu – Boulet
Jean Gras – Roger
Gabriel Gobin – Police Sergeant
Rosine Luguet – Lisa
Antoine Marin – Armand
Georges Douking – The Priest
Jacques Monod – Mayor

Production
The film was shot on location in and around the tiny village of Le Rat, in the Corrèze département of central France. The entire production team stayed in what accommodation they could find locally for the duration of the shoot.

The director always saw Jeanne Moreau as the lead. He originally wanted Marlon Brando for the male lead, but scheduling could not be arranged.

Release
The film was released on VHS and DVD by MGM Home Entertainment in the United States in 1994 and 2002 respectively.

Awards
1967 - Won: BAFTA award for Best Costume Design in B&W [British] (Costume designer Jocelyn Rickards won).

1968 - Nominated: BAFTA Film Award: BAFTA Best British Cinematography (B/W) (Cinematographer David Watkin nominated).

The film was entered into the 1966 Cannes Film Festival.

References

External links
 
 
Mademoiselle, The Belle From Hell (TCM's Movie Morlocks)

British black-and-white films
1966 films
1966 romantic drama films
French independent films
BAFTA winners (films)
Films directed by Tony Richardson
British independent films
British drama films
1960s English-language films
1960s British films
1960s French films